Shanice Lorraine Wilson-Knox (née Wilson; born May 14, 1973) is an American singer-songwriter, actress and dancer. Shanice had the Billboard hit singles "I Love Your Smile" and "Silent Prayer" in 1991 and "Saving Forever for You" in 1993. In 1999, Shanice scored another hit song, "When I Close My Eyes", which peaked at No. 12 on the Billboard Hot 100 chart. Shanice is recognized for her coloratura soprano voice and her ability to sing in the whistle register.

Early life
Shanice Wilson was born in Pittsburgh, Pennsylvania, and relocated to Los Angeles, California with her mother Crystal, and her aunt Penni. Her mother and aunt went to Los Angeles in pursuit of careers in the music industry. They shifted their focus to Shanice and formed the management company Crystal Penni to cultivate and promote her talents. Shanice was nine years old when she appeared in a Kentucky Fried Chicken commercial with the legendary jazz vocalist Ella Fitzgerald. In 1984, she was part of the regular cast in the first thirteen episodes of the children's program Kids Incorporated. Shanice competed on Star Search as an eleven-year old, and later signed with A&M Records.

Recording career
In 1987, at the age of 14, A&M Records released her debut album, Discovery. It produced two top-ten R&B hits, "(Baby Tell Me) Can You Dance" and "No ½ Steppin'". Shanice went on to sign a deal with Motown Records in the summer of 1990, releasing Inner Child in late 1991, which included her best-known hit single "I Love Your Smile". It reached the top ten in 22 countries, including the U.S. Billboard Hot R&B/Hip-Hop Songs and No. 2 on the Billboard Hot 100. The album also featured a cover of Minnie Riperton's 1974 hit "Lovin' You", a rendition that brought attention to her three-and-a-half octave vocal range.

After Inner Child, Shanice continued to record albums, including 1994's 21… Ways to Grow with producer Rhett Lawrence, a Los Angeles session musician and Earth Wind & Fire guitarist Dick Smith. This effort was followed by a move to LaFace Records in 1997, who later released the 1999 album Shanice. While she has not achieved significant commercial success with subsequent albums, she has contributed to various film soundtracks, such as Boomerang ("Don't Wanna Love You") and The Meteor Man ("It's for You"). Shanice also achieved success with her top-ten hit "Saving Forever for You", from the Beverly Hills 90210 Soundtrack. She later recorded "If I Never Knew You", a duet with Jon Secada, for the original soundtrack of Disney's 1995 film Pocahontas. While still with Motown, she also recorded a cover version of "If I Were Your Woman" by Gladys Knight and the Pips. Tami Roman and the fellow members of her 90's R&B group quartet, Female, provided the backing vocals in the song, released via the Panther  soundtrack on May 2, 1995, weeks before the Pocahontas soundtrack was released on May 30, 1995.

Shanice occasionally does background vocals for other artists; she can be heard on Toni Braxton's "Come on Over Here" and "Un-Break My Heart", as well as Usher's "Bedtime". In 2010 she performed vocals on the track "Behind the Mask", from Michael Jackson's posthumous album Michael. Shanice recorded the song "A Midnight Rendezvous" for the 2012 Kinect game  Rhythm Party. She also performed "Love Is the Gift", the English theme song for the video game The Bouncer. Shanice returned to recording after a five-year hiatus and released her fifth studio album Every Woman Dreams on her own label Imajah (named for her two children). The album peaked at No. 30 on the R&B Albums Chart.

In 2019, Shanice returned with the new single "He Won't". In 2022, she was selected to sing the theme song of the Sesame Street spinoff series Mecha Builders, alongside Eric Bellinger.

Acting and other appearances
In addition to singing, Shanice is also an actress, first appearing in "Rock Enroll", a season five episode of Family Matters. In 2001, she made an appearance as a singer on her husband Flex's TV show One on One. That same year, she starred in the made-for-TV movie  One Special Moment, an adaptation of Brenda Jackson's 1998 novel of the same name.

In 1997, Shanice became the first Black performer to star in the role of Eponine in the musical Les Misérables on Broadway. In 2011, Shanice joined Niecy Nash and Frenchie Davis for the 21st Annual "Divas Simply Singing" HIV/AIDS charity event. Shanice and her husband, Flex, also starred in the OWN reality show Flex & Shanice, which premiered on November 1, 2014.

Personal life
On February 19, 2000, Shanice married actor/comedian Flex Alexander. They have two children, daughter Imani Shekinah Knox (born August 23, 2001) and son Elijah Alexander Knox (born March 5, 2004).

Discography

Studio albums
 Discovery (1987)
 Inner Child (1991)
 21... Ways to Grow (1994)
 Shanice (1999)
 Every Woman Dreams (2006)

Awards

Grammy Awards

The Grammy Awards (originally called the Gramophone Awards) — or Grammys – are presented annually by the National Academy of Recording Arts and Sciences of the United States for outstanding achievements in the music industry. The awards ceremony features performances by prominent artists, and some of the awards of more popular interest are presented in a widely viewed televised ceremony.

Golden Lion Award

Soul Train Music Awards

The Soul Train Music Awards is an annual award show aired in national television syndication that honors the best in Black music and entertainment. It is produced by the makers of Soul Train, the program from which it takes its name, and features musical performances by various R&B and hip hop music recording artists interspersed throughout the ceremonies.

References

External links
 
 
 
 All about Shanice

1973 births
Living people
21st-century American women singers
21st-century American singers
African-American actresses
20th-century African-American women singers
African-American women singer-songwriters
American child singers
American contemporary R&B singers
American women pop singers
American women singer-songwriters
American soul singers
American sopranos
American musical theatre actresses
Dance-pop musicians
Musicians from Pittsburgh
Singer-songwriters from Pennsylvania
Singers with a five-octave vocal range
Motown artists
A&M Records artists
20th-century American singers
20th-century American women singers
21st-century African-American women singers